Afromyelois is a monotypic snout moth genus described by Boris Balinsky in 1991. It contains the single species Afromyelois communis, described by the same author, which is found in South Africa.

References

Endemic moths of South Africa
Phycitinae
Monotypic moth genera
Moths of Africa